The World Allround Speed Skating Championships for Men took place on 13 and 14 February 1971 in Göteborg at the Ullevi ice rink.

Title holder was the Netherlander Ard Schenk.

Result

  DNS = Did not start
  * = Fell

Source:

Attribution
In Dutch

References 

World Allround Speed Skating Championships, 1971
1971 World Allround